Johann Martin Chladni (Latinized Chladenius; Lutherstadt Wittenberg, 17 April 1710 – Erlangen, 10 September 1759) was a German philosopher, theologian and historian, who is seen as one of the founders of Hermeneutics.

He was the son of Martin Chladenius (1669–1725), Professor of Theology at Wittenberg University.

He is the author of Allgemeine Geschichtswissenschaft (1752).

References

1710 births
1759 deaths
18th-century philosophers
Continental philosophers
German philosophers
Hermeneutists
18th-century German male writers